Ruben Aquino (born December 18, 1953) is a Japanese-born Filipino-American animator. A character animator and a supervising animator who has formerly worked on many films at Walt Disney Animation Studios, his work has included the several Disney characters, including Maurice in Beauty and the Beast, Simba as an adult in The Lion King, Chief Powhatan in Pocahontas, Li Shang and Fa Li in Mulan, Pleakly and David Kawena in Lilo & Stitch, Denahi in Brother Bear, and Eudora and James in The Princess and the Frog. His style is easily recognized by his powerful figures and his extremely geometric facial movements.

Early life
Ruben A. Aquino was born on December 18, 1953 in Okinawa, Japan. His mother is Japanese while his father is Filipino.

He studied in Christ the King International School in Okinawa from kindergarten to high school and graduated in 1971. He attended the University of Pennsylvania in Philadelphia and majored in architecture.

Professional career
From 1975 to 1979, Ruben worked as a graphic artist in Honolulu, Hawaii. He worked for Farmhouse Films as a trainee, which was his first job in animation.

After moving to Los Angeles in 1980, he worked for Hanna-Barbera in visual development, character design, and layout. He was laid off after a year.

Months later, he was able to enter Walt Disney Feature Animation's clean-up training program and after completing it, he worked on a 30-second animation test of Fflewddur Fflam from The Black Cauldron and submitted it to the review board. He was promoted to animating assistant and worked for Disney from 1982 until 2013.

Filmography

Notes

References

External links

Living people
1953 births
American artists of Filipino descent
American artists of Japanese descent
Animators from California
Animators from Hawaii
Annie Award winners
Japanese people of Filipino descent
People from Okinawa Prefecture
University of Pennsylvania School of Design alumni
Walt Disney Animation Studios people